The Langworthy House, also known as the Octagon House, is an historic building located in Dubuque, Iowa, United States. Built in 1856, it was designed by local architect John F. Rague for local politician Edward Langworthy. The two-story brick home features tall windows, a columned entry, and a windowed cupola.  Langworthy and three of his brothers were among the first settlers in Dubuque.  They were partners in a lead mine, helped to build the territorial road between Dubuque and Iowa City, they farmed, invested in real estate, and they owned a steamboat and a mercantile exchange. The house has been passed down through Langworthy's descendants.  It was individually listed on the National Register of Historic Places in 1975, and it was included as a contributing property in the Langworthy Historic District in 2004.

References

Houses completed in 1856
Octagon houses in Iowa
Houses in Dubuque, Iowa
National Register of Historic Places in Dubuque, Iowa
Houses on the National Register of Historic Places in Iowa
Individually listed contributing properties to historic districts on the National Register in Iowa